Lake Harriet is a reservoir in Clackamas County of the U.S. state of Oregon.

See also 
 List of lakes in Oregon

References 

Harriet
Harriet
Buildings and structures in Clackamas County, Oregon
Protected areas of Clackamas County, Oregon
Mount Hood National Forest